Live at the 12 Bar: An Authorised Bootleg is a straight-to-DAT concert recording by Scottish folk musician Bert Jansch released in August 1996. The concert was recorded in The 12 Bar Club, Denmark Street, London in 1995. The CD was originally available in a supposedly limited edition at gigs, in a dark blue and black sleeve, the Jansch Records version was subsequently repressed and distributed by Cooking Vinyl (to whom Bert was actually contracted at the time), though it never appeared as an official Cooking Vinyl release. Some later pressings used the same artwork but with black and white replacing blue and black.

On 25 March 2015, Earth Recordings reissued the album (titled simply "Live At The 12 Bar", with new sleeve art by Kyle Lonsdale) in digital, CD, and vinyl formats.

Track listing
All tracks composed by Bert Jansch; except where indicated

"Summer Heat" - 4:21
"Curragh of Kildare" (Traditional) - 3:57
"Walk Quietly By" - 2:58
"Come Back Baby" (Walter Davis) - 2:54
"Blackwaterside" (Traditional) - 4:19
"Fresh as a Sweet Sunday Morning" - 3:11
"Morning Brings Peace of Mind" - 3:09
"The Lily of the West" (Traditional) - 4:18
"Kingfisher" - 2:40
"Trouble in Mind" (Richard M. Jones) - 2:54
"Just a Dream" - 3:18
"Blues Run the Game" (Jackson C. Frank) - 3:20
"Let Me Sing" - 3:22
"Strolling Down the Highway" - 3:01
"A Woman Like You" - 3:56
"Bett's Dance" - 2:34

Personnel
Bert Jansch - guitar, vocals

References

Bert Jansch albums
1996 live albums